The 1965 Paris–Nice was the 23rd edition of the Paris–Nice cycle race and was held from 9 March to 16 March 1965. The race started in Paris and finished in Nice. The race was won by Jacques Anquetil of the Ford France team.

General classification

References

1965
1965 in road cycling
1965 in French sport
March 1965 sports events in Europe
1965 Super Prestige Pernod